Garden City is a village in the Sealand area of Flintshire, Wales. The village began as a planned community for workers at the nearby steel works in Shotton, in accordance with company policy to give their workers decent housing. The village was originally intended to be called "Sealand Garden Suburb" and was planned to be four times bigger, but construction was halted by the advent of the First World War.

Wirral band OMD recorded the 1984 track "Garden City", a successor to 1981's "Sealand".

References

Villages in Flintshire